Kyaw Zin Oo (born 8 October 1994) is a footballer from Burma, and a left defender for Myanmar and plays club football with Yangon United.

Club career

Yangon United
In 2018 MNL season, Yangon United Captain Khin Maung Lwin retired and Kyaw Zin Oo have chance to play at left wing-back. Min Kyaw Khant got red card against Shan United F.C. and Kyaw Zin Oo become first line-up player.

References

1994 births
Living people
People from Shan State
Burmese footballers
Myanmar international footballers
Yangon United F.C. players
Association football defenders